The olive long-tailed cuckoo (Cercococcyx olivinus) is a species of cuckoo in the family Cuculidae.
It is found throughout the African tropical rainforest.

References

olive long-tailed cuckoo
Birds of the African tropical rainforest
olive long-tailed cuckoo
Taxonomy articles created by Polbot